Adam Ferrara is an American actor and comedian known for playing the role of Chief "Needles" Nelson on the FX series Rescue Me. He was a co-host on the U.S. version of Top Gear and played NYPD Sgt. Frank Verelli opposite Edie Falco on Showtime series Nurse Jackie. He also played Detective Tommy Manetti on the television series The Job.

Biography
Ferrara grew up in Huntington Station, New York in an Italian-American family.
He is married to indie actress Alex Tyler, who is on the cover of his comedy DVD Funny as Hell. She also plays the "Beautiful She Devil" in the special's introductory sketch.

Career
Ferrara has performed on Comedy Central Presents and has twice been nominated for the American Comedy Award for Best Male Stand-Up. Ferrara frequently performs stand-up at Caroline's and the Comedy Cellar. Ferrara also tours often, performing stand-up at the top clubs around the country.

He has performed stand-up several times on The Tonight Show, the Late Show with David Letterman, and Comedy Central. His stand-up was featured in Comedy Central's animated series Shorties Watchin' Shorties in 2004.

In 2009, Ferrara performed in an hour stand-up special which aired on Comedy Central entitled Funny As Hell, and was released on DVD the same day.  Ferrara appeared on The Tony Kornheiser Show on January 24, 2013, and has made numerous in-person and telephone appearances since that time.

Ferrara co-hosted the American version of Top Gear.

He recently came up with his new podcast '30 Minutes You’ll Never Get Back', which was listed as a 'must listen' by Hidden Remote.

Filmography

References
Notes

General citations

External links
 
 

Living people
1966 births
American male film actors
American stand-up comedians
American people of Italian descent
American male television actors
Television personalities from New York City
People from Huntington Station, New York
Male actors from New York City
Comedians from New York City
20th-century American comedians
21st-century American comedians